Ad gloriam is the first album by the Italian rock band Le Orme. Released in 1969, the album's sound differs significantly from the progressive rock that Le Orme would become known for, having more of a beat and psychedelic rock feel. The record was released on Carlo Alberto Rossi's Milan-based CAR Juke Box label.

One of the songs included on the album, "Senti l'estate che torna", had previously competed in 1968 on Un disco per l'estate, a televised music competition run by the Italian Phonographic Association in collaboration with Radiotelevisione Italiana, finishing in the top 24 of 56 songs.

Another song, "Ad Gloriam", was remixed by Irish DJ David Holmes for his 2000 album Bow Down to the Exit Sign, under the name "69 Police". It was then re-used in the Oceans Eleven soundtrack, where it features prominently in the final scene.

Track listing
All music by Aldo Tagliapietra unless otherwise noted. All lyrics by Nino Smeraldi.

Side one
 "Introduzione" – 1:45
 "Ad gloriam" – 5:31
 "Oggi verrà" – 2:32
 "Milano 1968" – 3:12
 "I miei sogni" – 3:00

Side two
 "Mita Mita" – 2:53 (Luciano Zotti)
 "Fumo" – 3:39
 "Senti l'estate che torna" – 2:47 (Italo Salizzato, Giuseppe Damele)
 "Fiori di giglio" – 3:07
 "Non so restare solo" – 5:28
 "Conclusione" – 1:42

Personnel 
 Aldo Tagliapietra — lead vocals, acoustic guitar, flute, celesta
 Nino Smeraldi — lead guitar, sarangi, backing vocals
 Claudio Galieti — bass guitar, cello, backing vocals
 Tony Pagliuca — organ, harpsichord, electric piano
 Michi Dei Rossi — drums, timpani, bongos, tambourine

References

1969 debut albums
Le Orme albums
Italian-language albums